Joe Crookston is an American folk singer from Randolph, Ohio. As of February 2023, he has released four albums and one EP (Chapter) on the Milagrito Records label: 2004's "Fall Down as the Rain", 2008's "Able Baker Charlie & Dog", 2011's "Darkling & the BlueBird Jubilee", 2014's "Georgia I'm Here", and 2023's "NINE BECOMES ONE chapter 9  [start brave]" (February 19, 2023)

Biography 
Crookston's family origins include Hungary, and his website reports that polkas and Eastern European food figured in his upbringing. Joe Crookston was born and raised in rural Ohio and attended Kent State University. In 1987, while at college, he attended the Kent State Folk Festival and his musical interests shifted to focus on folk music, causing him to sell his classical guitar and acquire a steel stringed acoustic. Crookston lived in Seattle, Washington from 1996 until 2004. For about a year during this time he worked with troubled youth in a prison.

As of 2023 he is based in Ithaca, New York and tours extensively around the U.S., Canada and Ireland.

Awards and recognition 
Crookston's first label album, Fall Down as the Rain, was selected by Performing Songwriter Magazine as one of 2004's top 12 self-produced independent recordings, and was featured on National Public Radio's All Songs Considered, The Midnight Special and Folkscene. Crookston was a finalist in the Mountain Stage NewSong contest.

In 2007, Crookston received a Rockefeller Foundation grant for a project called "Songs of the Finger Lakes". Emulating Woody Guthrie, he spent a year traveling in the Finger Lakes region of New York state, collecting stories to turn into songs. Four songs from this project were incorporated into his second album.

In the summer of 2007, audiences at the Falcon Ridge Folk Festival selected him as one of the artists they most wanted to have perform at the following year's festival. In Spring 2008, Crookston and the other "Most Wanted" award winners (Anthony da Costa, Randall Williams and Lindsay Mac) were sent on a 23 concert promotional tour in the northeastern U.S., with venues including the Kennedy Center and Club Passim.

In February 2009, his second CD, Able Baker Charlie & Dog was given the "Album of the Year" award by the Folk Alliance International in a ceremony in Memphis, Tennessee, indicating that it received more radio airplay than any other folk album released in 2008.

In February 2016, he was named Artist in Residence by the Folk Alliance International. He collaborated with The National WW1 Museum and Memorial in Kansas City MO to write the song, "The Letters of Florence Hemphill" about a 19 year old nurse who served in France during WWI. 

January 19, 2018, he had an art installment and concert at True North Gallery in Waterdown, Ontario. His paintings are installed in the gallery alongside paintings by other musicians, including Andy Warhol, Bob Dylan, and Janis Joplin.

Throughout 2023, he will release "NINE BECOMES ONE" a series of nine "Chapters" each containing five newly recorded songs. The first "Chapter" NINE BECOMES ONE  chapter 9 [start brave] will be released on February 19, 2023.

Music

Earlier albums 
Crookston released three CDs on his own independent label: Nobody Told Me, Michaelangelo Knew, and Rounding the Square.

Fall Down as the Rain (2004) 
 Fall Down as the Rain
 Don't Bring Me Flowers
 The Good Stuff
 The Sylvan Song
 Satisfied (Charlie and the Chocolate Factory)
 Mostly
 If I Say Yes
 Dance and Sway
 Blue
 Little Pink
 Poor Me / (May There Always Be Sunshine)
 Mostly (the Chaco Canyon live mix)

Able Baker Charlie & Dog (2008) 
 The Logical Song, a cover version of a Supertramp song
 John Jones, from the Finger Lakes Project, about an escaped slave who relocated to Elmira, New York and became part of the Underground Railroad
 Wandering Shepherd
 Freddy the Falcon, based on a prison inmate Crookston worked with
 Brooklyn in July
 Red Rooster in the Mash Pile, from the Finger Lakes Project, based on the story of a family's chickens getting drunk from the wastage of an illegal still during Prohibition
 Able Baker Charlie and Dog, based on his grandfather Joe Gnap's memories of working as a Seabee to construct the runways on Tinian island that were used to launch the atomic bomb attacks on Japan.
 Mending Walls
 Hands Metal and Wood
 Blue Tattoo, from the Finger Lakes Project, about an Auschwitz survivor explaining her tattoo to her young daughter.
 Bird by Bird
 Red Rooster in the Mash Pile (Live in Ithaca, NY)
 The Rutabaga Curl (Live in Ithaca, NY)

Darkling & the BlueBird Jubilee (2011) 
 I Sing
 Caitlin at the Window, about Caitlin Thomas
 Mercy Now, by Mary Gauthier
 Good Luck John
 The Nazarene
 Darkling & the BlueBird Jubilee
 Everything Here is Good
 Wilderness Alone
 Blue, also on his 2004 album
 A Friend Like You
 To Keep You Warm
 Darkling/BlueBird (Fear & Transcend)

Georgia I'm Here (2014) 
 Georgia I'm Here (The Invocation)
 Riding the Train (The Dream Mix)
 Impermanent Things
 Tuesday Morning (For Roko)
 Big Sky (In the Middle of Nowhere)
 Miner in the Mourning
 Black Dress (I'm in Love With a Woman)
 Riding the Train (The Meter Maid Mix)
 Pretty Saro
 Fall Down as the Rain (2014)
 Out On the Run (For Josie Rae)
 Georgia I'm Here (Amen)

NINE BECOMES ONE  chapter 9 [start brave]  (February 19, 2023)  

 Looking for Yes
 Blue Light
 Photography
 Garlic
 Get Myself Free!

Unreleased 
Crookston has written songs that do not appear on any of his Milgarito albums including:
 Crooked Frame
 Little Bit Lovely and a Little Bit Mean
 a song based on a challenge from a friend to write a country song using the words "cheatin", "pickup truck", "beer", and "tofu"
 https://www.youtube.com/watch?v=5_AG25-nSNI / Brand new song May 2015 I'm Satisfied I've Had Enough.

References 

 Artist's website, www.joecrookston.com
 Falcon Ridge Preview Tour plays 23 Northeastern Venues
 A song and a request for Eliot Spitzer
 2007 bio for the Finger Lakes Song Festival
 Concert review by Jonathan Fox in the Narrowsburg NY "River Reporter"
 https://vimeo.com/94228071/ Trailer for a documentary film inspired by Joe Crookston's song "Blue Tattoo"

Living people
Year of birth missing (living people)
American male singer-songwriters
American folk singers
People from Portage County, Ohio
Place of birth missing (living people)
Kent State University alumni
Singer-songwriters from Ohio